Joel Martin Zumaya (born November 9, 1984) is a former American professional baseball pitcher. He pitched in Major League Baseball for the Detroit Tigers from 2006 through 2010.

Baseball career
Zumaya was drafted out of Bonita Vista High School in the 11th round by the Tigers, the 320th overall selection of the 2002 MLB Draft. He was chosen because of his power arm, but it was not clear whether he would be able to develop adequate control of an off-speed pitch. He is known for his  fastball, which catcher Ivan Rodriguez credits as having been the fastest pitch he ever caught.

Minor league career
Zumaya began his stint in the Tigers minor league system as a starting pitcher. Because he was drafted straight out of high school, Zumaya frequently pitched against players older than himself. In 2003, the 18-year-old Zumaya made great strides pitching for the Low-A affiliate West Michigan Whitecaps. 2004 saw Zumaya begin the year pitching for the High-A affiliate Lakeland Tigers, before a late season promotion to the Double-A Erie SeaWolves. He finished the season with a .500 win–loss record and struggled with walks. Zumaya began the 2005 season back in Erie; however, his results were much improved from 2004, and he was soon promoted to the Triple-A Toledo Mud Hens. He finished the season with 199 strikeouts in 151 innings pitched. In 77 games over four seasons, Zumaya was 27–19, and averaged 6.4 hits and 11.1 strikeouts per nine innings.

Major league career

Detroit Tigers (2006–2011)
With the Tigers, he was most often used as a middle relief pitcher and occasionally as a setup man. This was the fastest pitch ever recorded at that time. He also had a very good knuckle-curve that he used as an off-speed pitch. He was among the primary reasons for the Tigers bullpen success in 2006, joining fellow rookie Justin Verlander on the resurgent 2006 Tigers team. However, Zumaya was hampered by injuries to his throwing arm following his rookie season in 2006, and was never the same pitcher again.

While he held batters to a .187 batting average in 2006, he was even tougher with runners in scoring position (.176), and two outs and runners in scoring position (.143). Zumaya remained in the bullpen for the 2006 playoffs.  However, Zumaya was sidelined for the 2006 American League Championship Series by a sore wrist, which Tigers general manager Dave Dombrowski disclosed in a December 2006 radio interview was due to Zumaya playing the PlayStation 2 video game Guitar Hero. This was acknowledged by the game's developers with a message on the credits of the Xbox 360 version of Guitar Hero II: No pitchers were harmed in the making of this game. Except for one. Joel Zumaya. He had it coming.  In a 2016 interview with the Detroit News, however, Zumaya said the Guitar Hero story was just a cover, and not true.  While refusing to disclose the actual source of the injury, and calling the Guitar Hero story his "final answer," he also admitted that it was "some bogus stuff."

Zumaya's future was then clouded by injury: in May 2007, he ruptured a tendon in his hand, requiring surgery and 12 weeks rehab. On August 2, 2007, the Tigers activated Zumaya from the 15-day disabled list after not playing since May 1. The next day, he made his first major league appearance following the injury, pitching to one batter in a game against the Cleveland Indians.

Zumaya sustained another injury, this time to his shoulder, during the 2007 offseason. While helping his father move some boxes in the attic at his father's home in advance of a fire approaching the area, a  box fell on his right (pitching) shoulder, separating it.

He was placed on the 60-day disabled list at the start of the 2008 season. After appearing in six successful minor league rehab games for the Single-A Lakeland Flying Tigers and Triple-A Toledo Mud Hens, Zumaya rejoined the Tigers on June 20, 2008.

Zumaya was placed on the 15-day DL with a sore right shoulder on March 27, 2009. He was reactivated by the end of April; however, he was placed back on the 15-day DL following a July 18 appearance against the New York Yankees, where it was reported he could barely move his right (throwing) arm. Zumaya had surgery in August, ending his season.

On June 28, 2010, Zumaya injured his elbow in the eighth inning, while pitching against the Minnesota Twins' Delmon Young at Target Field.  He was in obvious pain and needed assistance walking off the field.  The next day an MRI revealed he had a non-displaced fracture of the olecranon. Doctors said it would take four months to heal, ending his season.

Zumaya missed the entire 2011 season after undergoing exploratory surgery on his right elbow on May 10. While the surgery, performed by Dr. James Andrews found no new damage, it was determined that the screw inserted during his previous surgery needed to be replaced. He was unable to recover sufficiently to return to the team that season, his last before being able to enter free agency for the 2012 season.

Minnesota Twins (2012)
On January 15, 2012, Zumaya agreed to a one-year contract with the Minnesota Twins worth $800,000 to $1.7 million.

On February 25, 2012, Zumaya tore an ulnar collateral ligament in his throwing elbow 13 pitches into a live batting practice session, requiring Tommy John surgery and ending his 2012 season, in which he was guaranteed to earn $400,000. He was released  on March 3.

Zumaya retired in February 2014.

Record-setting fastballs

Zumaya hit  on the Comerica Park radar gun on August 7 while pitching against Minnesota Twins infielder Nick Punto. Zumaya reached  or higher on five of six pitches during the at-bat.  He also reached  during the Tigers' 4–3 playoff victory at Yankee Stadium on October 5, 2006; and also on October 10, 2006, during Game 1 of the ALCS in Oakland, against the A's.

In an interview for Detroit radio station WRIF, former Tigers pitcher Denny McLain stated that he believed the numbers on stadium and television radar guns were inflated. However, he also claimed that Zumaya had the most consistently fast pitches he had seen in person since former Houston Astros Nolan Ryan and J. R. Richard.

However, there is a new technology on the horizon that reads pitch speeds more accurately and does not inflate those numbers. It uses cameras and software to obtain the data. This new technology comes from Major League Baseball in its Advanced Media section. Part of Enhanced Gameday tracks pitch speed, break, and trajectory.

Zumaya led the major leagues with 233.

In 2009 and 2010, Zumaya's fastball averaged , according to Pitch f/x.

See also

Best pitching seasons by a Detroit Tiger

References

External links

Major League Baseball pitchers
Detroit Tigers players
Gulf Coast Tigers players
West Michigan Whitecaps players
Lakeland Tigers players
Erie SeaWolves players
Toledo Mud Hens players
Lakeland Flying Tigers players
Baseball players from San Diego
American baseball players of Mexican descent
Sportspeople from Chula Vista, California
1984 births
Living people